Tauchira is a genus of grasshoppers (Acrididae) in the subfamily Catantopinae and tribe Tauchirini. Species can be found in South-East Asia.

Species
The Orthoptera Species File lists the following:
Tauchira abbreviata Serville, 1838
Tauchira buae Bolívar, 1898
Tauchira damingshana Zheng, 1984
Tauchira grandiceps Willemse, 1928
Tauchira hunanensis Fu & Zheng, 1999
Tauchira karnyi Willemse, 1925
Tauchira longipennis Liang, 1989
Tauchira obliqueannulata Brunner von Wattenwyl, 1898
Tauchira oreophilus Tinkham, 1940
Tauchira polychroa (Stål, 18750 - type species (as Oxya polychroa Stål)
Tauchira rufotibialis Willemse, 1925
Tauchira vietnamensis Storozhenko, 1992

References

External links
 Images at Phuket Nature Tours (grasshoppers) of Tauchira polychroa.
 
 
 

Acrididae genera
Catantopinae